Northlands College is a public post-secondary educational institution in Northern, Saskatchewan, Canada.

Northlands College is a dynamic and growing Public Regional College located in northern Saskatchewan that provides a diverse mix of educational programs and services in Health and Wellness, University Studies, Trades and Technology and Flexible Learning.

Campus
The college has campuses in La Ronge, Creighton and Buffalo Narrows.  Administration of the college is run out of the Administration building in Air Ronge.  Programs are also offered in communities throughout northern Saskatchewan.

Governance
Northlands College was formed by the amalgamation of the La Ronge Region Community College, Westside Community College, and North East Community College in 1986.  Originally known as Northlands Career College, its name was shortened to Northlands College.  The college is governed by a 10-member board, representing people from across northern Saskatchewan.

Partnerships
Northlands College offers accredited educational, post-secondary, vocational and skills training opportunities for residence of Northern Saskatchewan. The college hosts the SRnet presence in the region.

Northlands College maintains reciprocal arrangements with educational partners, including:
University of Regina  
University of Saskatchewan
University of the Arctic
Northern College
Saskatchewan Polytechnic

See also
Higher education in Saskatchewan
List of agricultural universities and colleges
List of colleges in Canada#Saskatchewan

References

All facts, unless otherwise stated, are from Northlands College's web site

External links
 Northlands College website

Education in Saskatchewan
University of Saskatchewan